This is a list of notable people who have, or had, the medical condition epilepsy. Following from that, there is a short list of people who have received a speculative, retrospective diagnosis of epilepsy. Finally there is a substantial list of people who are often wrongly believed to have had epilepsy.

Epilepsy and greatness
A possible link between epilepsy and greatness has fascinated biographers and physicians for centuries. In his Treatise on Epilepsy, the French 17th century physician Jean Taxil refers to Aristotle's "famous epileptics". This list includes Heracles, Ajax, Bellerophon, Socrates, Plato, Empedocles, Maracus of Syracuse, and the Sibyls. However, historian of medicine Owsei Temkin argues that Aristotle had in fact made a list of melancholics and had only associated Heracles with the "Sacred Disease". Taxil goes on to add his own names: Roman Emperor Caligula, Drusus (tribune of the Roman people), and Petrarch. Neurologist John Hughes concluded that the majority of famous people alleged to have epilepsy did not in fact have this condition.

Certain diagnosis

The following categorized chronological list contains only those people for whom a firm and uncontested diagnosis was made during their lifetime.

Acting

Leadership, politics and royalty

Music

Sport

Art and writing

Miscellaneous

Retrospective diagnosis

The following people were not diagnosed with epilepsy during their lifetime. A retrospective diagnosis is speculative and, as detailed below, can be wrong.

Religious figures

There is a long-standing notion that epilepsy and religion are linked, and it has been speculated that many religious figures had temporal lobe epilepsy. The temporal lobes generate the feeling of "I", and give a sense of familiarity or strangeness to the perceptions of the senses. The temporal lobes and adjacent anterior insular cortex seem to be involved in mystical experiences, and in the change in personality that may result from such experiences. 

Raymond Bucke's Cosmic Consciousness (1901) contains several case-studies of people who have realized "cosmic consciousness". James Leuba's The psychology of religious mysticism noted that "among the dread diseases that afflict humanity there is only one that interests us quite particularly; that disease is epilepsy." Several of Bucke's cases are also mentioned in J.E. Bryant's 1953 book, Genius and Epilepsy, which has a list of more than 20 people that combines the great and the mystical. 

Slater and Beard and renewed the interest in TLE and religious experience in the 1960s. Dewhurst and Beard (1970) described six cases of TLE-patients who underwent sudden religious conversions. They placed these cases in the context of several western saints who had a sudden conversion, who were or may have been epileptic. Dewhurst and Beard described several aspects of conversion experiences, and did not favor one specific mechanism. 

Norman Geschwind described behavioral changes related to temporal lobe epilepsy in the 1970s and 1980s. Now called Geschwind syndrome, he defined a cluster of specific personality characteristics often found in patients with temporal lobe epilepsy, which include increased religiosity. Evidence of Geschwind syndrome has been identified in some religious figures, in particular pronounced religiosity and hypergraphia (excessive writing). However, critics note that these characteristics can be the result of any illness, and are not sufficiently descriptive for patients with temporal lobe epilepsy. 

Neuropsychiatrist Peter Fenwick, in the 1980s and 1990s, also found a relationship between the right temporal lobe and mystical experience, but also found that pathology or brain damage is only one of many possible causal mechanisms for these experiences. He questioned the earlier accounts of religious figures with temporal lobe epilepsy, noticing that "very few true examples of the ecstatic aura and the temporal lobe seizure had been reported in the world scientific literature prior to 1980". According to Fenwick, "It is likely that the earlier accounts of temporal lobe epilepsy and temporal lobe pathology and the relation to mystic and religious states owes more to the enthusiasm of their authors than to a true scientific understanding of the nature of temporal lobe functioning." 

The occurrence of intense religious feelings in people with epilepsy in general is considered rare, with an incident rate of about 2–3%. Sudden religious conversion, together with visions, has been documented in only a small number of individuals with temporal lobe epilepsy. The occurrence of religious experiences in TLE-patients may as well be explained by religious attribution, due to the background of these patients. Nevertheless, the neurological research of mystical experiences is a growing field of research, searching for specific neurological explanations of mystical experiences. Study of ecstatic seizures may provide clues for the neurological mechanisms giving rise to mystical experiences, such as the anterior insular cortex, which is involved in self-awareness and subjective certainty. 

People listed below are not necessarily known to have epilepsy nor indicate a scholarly consensus in favour of epilepsy; merely that such a diagnosis has been suggested.

Misdiagnosis

Many famous people are incorrectly recorded as having epilepsy. In some cases there is no evidence at all to justify a diagnosis of epilepsy. In others, the symptoms have been misinterpreted. In some, the seizures were provoked by other causes, such as acute illness or alcohol withdrawal.

No evidence

The following people are often reported to have had epilepsy but there is no evidence that they had any attacks or illnesses that even resembled epilepsy.

Misdiagnosis by association

Many individuals have been mistakenly recorded as having epilepsy due to an association with someone (real or fictional) who did have epilepsy, or something similar.

Provoked seizures

The following people may have had one or more epileptic seizures but since the seizures were provoked, they do not result in a diagnosis of epilepsy:

Similar conditions

There are many conditions that produce paroxysmal attacks or events. These events (especially in historical, non-medical literature such as biographies) are often called fits, seizures or convulsions. Those terms do not exclusively apply to epilepsy and such events are sometimes categorised as non-epileptic seizures. When studied in detail, the attacks were more fully described as "fits of spleen", "seized by pain", "convulsed with anguish", etc.

Notes and references

Sources

  
 
 

Lists of people with disabilities
 
Epilepsy